Thula Thula Private Game Reserve is a private game reserve situated in Zululand, KwaZulu-Natal province in South Africa. It is part of the Royal Zulu Biosphere.

Thula Thula means ‘peace and tranquility’ in Zulu.

History 
Thula Thula was once the private hunting grounds of the mighty Zulu Warrior, King Shaka. The first historic meeting between Shaka and his father, Senzangakhona, which set the stage for the creation of the Zulu Nation. took place at the Nseleni River at Thula Thula.

The land became a game reserve in 1911 and is believed to be the oldest private game reserve in KwaZulu-Natal.

The game reserve has two lodges.

Owners 
Thula Thula was owned by international conservationist and founder of the Earth Organization, Lawrence Anthony and his wife Francoise Malby-Anthony. Later, the Earth Organization was separated from Thula Thula, and Francoise Malby-Anthony founded the South African Conservation Fund to operate Thula Thula. Anthony died in 2012 and the reserve is now run by his wife Francoise Malby-Anthony. The reserve is the setting for Lawrence's books The Elephant Whisperer (2009) and The Last Rhino (2012). In 2018 Francoise Malby-Anthony published a sequel to Lawrence's book An Elephant in my Kitchen (2018)

Wildlife 
Thula Thula is home to a wide variety of animals, including African elephant, buffalo, white rhino, leopard, giraffe, zebra, nyala, hyena, crocodile, kudu, wildebeest as well as other indigenous species.  Over 350 species of birdlife has been identified, including a breeding population of white-backed vulture.

Conservation 
Since Lawrence's death in 2012, his wife Francoise has started various conservation projects including a Wildlife Rehabilitation Center and a Conservation Volunteer Camp.
For her effort in conservation Francoise was awarded the French Abroad Award at the Ministry of Europe and Foreign Affairs in Paris in March 2019.

Elephants 
In 1999 Lawrence Anthony was asked to accept a herd of 'rogue' wild elephants from Mpumalanga onto Thula Thula which were destined to be shot unless alternative arrangements could be made.  The herd was housed in a boma on Thula Thula but managed to break free and escape.  The elephants were successfully tracked, recovered and transported back to Thula Thula.  The story of their rehabilitation and Lawrence's subsequent relationship with the herd is told in his book The Elephant Whisperer.  The elephant herd, including Nana, Frankie and Mabula are still at Thula Thula as of 2018. The herd had grown to 29 elephants as of 2018. The matriarch Frankie died of a liver failure in January 2021, leaving 28 elephants remaining at Thula Thula.

References

External links
Thula Thula Website
Thula Thula German Website
Thula Thula Photography Web Page
Book published by Francoise Malby-Anthony about Thula Thula
Conservation Fund launched by Francoise Malby-Anthony
Lawrence Anthony & Friends
Global Animal - Interview with Lawrence Anthony
CNN African Voices - Interview with Lawrence Anthony from Thula Thula
Roaming the Hunting Grounds of a Zulu King - The Cutting Edge News

Game reserves of South Africa